Thomas A. Kennedy (born 1955) is an American business executive. He was the chief executive officer (CEO) and chairman of the Raytheon Company from March 2014 to April 2020.

Education 
Kennedy has a BS degree in Electrical Engineering from Rutgers University and a MS degree from Air Force Institute of Technology. Kennedy has a doctorate degree in Engineering from UCLA.

Career 
In 1983, Kennedy joined Raytheon Corporation in the area of radar development. Since April 2013, Kennedy has served as executive VP and COO of Raytheon.

In March 2014, at age 58, Kennedy became the CEO of Raytheon, succeeding William H. Swanson. Kennedy was elected to the board of directors in January 2014.

In April 2020, Raytheon Company completed their merger with United Technologies Corporation (UTC) to form Raytheon Technologies. UTC CEO Gregory J. Hayes was named CEO of the combined company, and Kennedy was named Executive Chairman.

References

External links 
 Profile of Thomas Kennedy at Bloomberg.com
 Biography of Thomas A. Kennedy, Ph.D. at Raytheon.com (pdf format)

1956 births
Living people
American chief executives
Raytheon Company people
20th-century American businesspeople
21st-century American businesspeople
Rutgers University alumni
Air Force Institute of Technology alumni
University of California, Los Angeles alumni
Raytheon Technologies people